Pasha Kola-ye Afrakoti (also Romanized as Pāshā Kolā-ye Afrākotī; also known as Pāshā Kalā, Pāshā Kolā, and Pāshā Kūlā) is a village in Bisheh Sar Rural District, in the Central District of Qaem Shahr County, Mazandaran Province, Iran. At the 2006 census, its population was 354, in 103 families.

References 

Populated places in Qaem Shahr County